I Gotta Get Mine Yo! (Book of Rhymes) is the fourth studio album by Chubb Rock. It was released on September 1, 1992, via Select Records. Production was handled entirely by Trackmasters and Chubb Rock himself. It features contributions from Erma Franklin, Deneen Lowe, Eric Milteer, Curt Gowdy, Rob Swinga and Grand Puba. The album peaked at #127 on the Billboard 200 and at #24 on the Top R&B/Hip-Hop Albums. It spawned two singles: "Lost in the Storm" and "Yabadabadoo"/"I'm Too Much".

Track listing

Personnel
Richard Simpson – vocals, producer
Erma Franklin – vocals (track 2)
Jean-Claude Olivier – additional vocals (track 4), producer
Richard Pimentel – additional vocals (track 4)
Deneen Lowe – vocals (tracks: 5, 6)
Samuel Barnes – additional vocals (tracks: 9, 12), producer
Robert Dicks – additional vocals (track 9)
Maxwell Dixon – additional vocals (track 12)
Eric Milteer – vocals (tracks: 15, 16)
Frank "Nitty" Pimentel – producer
Alexander Richbourg – producer
Herb Powers Jr. – mastering
Amy Bennick – art direction
Michael Britto – photography
Peter Bodtke – photography

References

External links

1992 albums
Chubb Rock albums
Select Records albums
Elektra Records albums
Albums produced by Trackmasters